Statistics of the Swiss Super League for the 2008–09 football season.
Statistics of the Swiss Challenge League for the 2008–09 football season.
Statistics of the Swiss 1. Liga for the 2008–09 football season.
Statistics of the 2. Liga Interregional for the 2008–09 football season.

Super League

Challenge League

1. Liga

Group 1

Group 2

Group 3

Play-off to Challenge League

1st round

Final round

2. Liga Interregional

Gruppo 1

Gruppo 2

Gruppo 3

Gruppo 4

Gruppo 5

2. Liga

Promotion to 2. Liga interregional:
Aargauischer Fussballverband (AFV): FC Muri 					
Fussballverband Bern / Jura (FVBJ): FC Lerchenfeld & FC Köniz 					
Innerschweizerischer Fussballverband (IFV):FC Aegeri 					
Fussballverband Nordwestschweiz (FVNWS): FC Black Stars 					
Ostschweizer Fussballverband (OFV): FC Widnau & FC Amriswil 					
Solothurner Kantonal-Fussballverband (SKFV): FC Härkingen 					
Fussballverband Region Zürich (FVRZ): FC Zürich-Affoltern & FC Kosova 					
Federazione ticinese di calcio (FTC): AC Sementina 					
Freiburger Fussballverband (FFV): FC Kerzers 					
Association cantonale genevoise de football (ACGF): FC Geneva 					
Association neuchâteloise de football (ANF): Le Locle Sports 					
Association valaisanne de football (AVF): FC Sierre 					
Association cantonale vaudoise de football (ACVF): Lausanne-Sport U-21

References
 Swiss Football Federation